Cyrus Bacon ( 1796October 4, 1873) was a Michigan politician.

Bacon was born in Ballston, New York. On November 6, 1848, Bacon was elected to the Michigan House of Representatives, where he represented the Cass County district from January 1, 1849 to April 2, 1849. Bacon served on the Ways and Means committee. During his time in the legislature, he lived in Ontwa, Michigan.

References

1790s births
1873 deaths
Members of the Michigan House of Representatives
People from Ballston, New York
People from Cass County, Michigan
19th-century American politicians